764 Gedania (prov. designation:  or ) is a large background asteroid from the outer regions of the asteroid belt, approximately  in diameter. It was discovered on 26 September 1913, by German astronomer Franz Kaiser at the Heidelberg-Königstuhl State Observatory in southwest Germany. The carbonaceous C-type asteroid has a rotation period of 24.98 hours. It was named after the Polish city of Gdańsk where the discoverer was an assistant at the observatory during the 1920s.

Orbit and classification 

Gedania is a non-family asteroid of the main belt's background population when applying the hierarchical clustering method to its proper orbital elements. It orbits the Sun in the outer asteroid belt at a distance of 2.9–3.5 AU once every 5 years and 9 months (2,092 days; semi-major axis of 3.2 AU). Its orbit has an eccentricity of 0.09 and an inclination of 10° with respect to the ecliptic.

Naming 

This minor planet was named after the Latin name of the city of Gdańsk, Poland (formerly Free City of Danzig) where the discoverer, Franz Kaiser (1891–1962), was an assistant at the observatory during the early 1920s. The official naming citation was mentioned in The Names of the Minor Planets by Paul Herget in 1955. Asteroid 1419 Danzig was also named by its German name for the city of Gdańsk.

Physical characteristics 

In the Tholen classification, Gedania is a common carbonaceous C-type asteroid. It has also been classified as an hydrated Ch-type and as a Caa type in the Tholen- and SMASS-like taxonomic variant of the Small Solar System Objects Spectroscopic Survey (S3OS2).

Rotation period 

In February 2006, a rotational lightcurve of Gedania was obtained from photometric observations by collaborating astronomers Roberto Crippa, Federico Manzini , René Roy, Donn Starkey, Raoul Behrend and Laurent Bernasconi. Lightcurve analysis gave a rotation period of  hours with a brightness variation of  magnitude.

Diameter and albedo 

The Collaborative Asteroid Lightcurve Link derives an albedo of 0.0754 and a diameter of 58.18 kilometers based on an absolute magnitude of 9.6. These timed observations are taken when the asteroid passes in front of a distant star.

References

External links 
 Lightcurve Database Query (LCDB), at www.minorplanet.info
 Dictionary of Minor Planet Names, Google books
 Asteroids and comets rotation curves, CdR – Geneva Observatory, Raoul Behrend
 Discovery Circumstances: Numbered Minor Planets (1)-(5000) – Minor Planet Center
 
 

000764
Discoveries by Franz Kaiser
Named minor planets
000764
19130926